Pork is a meat from pigs.

Pork can also refer to:
 Pork (band), Argentine post-grunge band
 PORK (magazine), a music magazine
 Pork Peninsula, a cape in Nunavut, Canada
 Pork Recordings, an electronic music label
 Pork barrel, in American political slang: federal politics dealing with funding of local projects with little or no national significance
 Sexual intercourse (slang)
 HMS Pork, nickname for front half of HMS Porcupine (G93) while she was in two parts in 1943
 Pork, a theatre play by Andy Warhol
Porc, the Hungarian name for Porţ village, Marca Commune, Sălaj County, Romania
 Pork, an alternate name for the Dutch buckwheat-based dish Broeder
 Long pork, a term for human flesh eaten by cannibals

See also